Sofie Lundgaard (born 29 May 2002) is a Danish footballer who plays as a midfielder for Liverpool and has appeared for the Denmark women's national junior team.

Career
In February 2019, Lundgaard transferred to Fortuna Hjørring. She left the club on 10 January 2023 and signed for Liverpool.

Achievements 
Elitedivisionen 
Silver Medalist (1): 2018–19
Danish Women's Cup 
Winner (1): 2019

References

External links
 
 
 

2002 births
Living people
Danish women's footballers
Denmark women's international footballers
Women's association football midfielders
Fortuna Hjørring players
Sportspeople from Aalborg
Liverpool F.C. Women players